The 1977 Australian Tourist Trophy was a motor race staged at the Phillip Island circuit in Victoria, Australia on 13 November 1977. It was open to Group A Sports Cars and was recognized by the Confederation of Australian Motor Sport as an Australian Title. The race, which was the fifteenth Australian Tourist Trophy, was won by Ian Geoghegan of Sydney, driving the Porsche 935 of Laurie O’Neill. It was Geoghegan's third Australian Tourist Trophy victory.

Results

Race statistics
 Race distance: 20 laps, 60 miles, 96.54 km
 Race time : 37:27.1

References & notes

Australian Tourist Trophy
Tourist Trophy
Motorsport at Phillip Island